K. Rajan (born 19 January 1981 in Negeri Sembilan) is a Malaysian footballer currently Coach for N.NINE F.C. in FAM League.

A former Sarawak FA player, Rajan have played with several other teams in the Malaysia League.

He also has played with the Malaysia national football team.

Malacca United
On 13 November 2013, Rajan signed for Malaysian FAM League side Malacca United F.C. On 21 January 2014, Rajan made his debut for the club as substitute, in 2-1 FA Cup Malaysia lost against Perlis FA at home. On 23 March 2014, Rajan scored his first goal for Malacca . He scored the opener in Malacca United F.C.'s 3-1 away defeat to Kuala Lumpur FA

Malaysia Super League 2012

References

External links
 
 
 

1981 births
Living people
Malaysian footballers
Malaysia international footballers
Kuala Muda Naza F.C. players
Terengganu FC players
Sarawak FA players
Selangor FA players
Negeri Sembilan FA players
Sri Pahang FC players
People from Negeri Sembilan
Malaysian people of Tamil descent
Malaysian sportspeople of Indian descent
Melaka United F.C. players
Southeast Asian Games bronze medalists for Malaysia
Southeast Asian Games medalists in football
Association football midfielders
Competitors at the 2003 Southeast Asian Games